In enzymology, a flavonol 3-sulfotransferase is an enzyme that catalyzes the chemical reaction

3'-phosphoadenylyl sulfate + flavonol adenosine 3',5'-bisphosphate + flavonol 3-sulfate

Thus, the two substrates of this enzyme are 3'-phosphoadenylyl sulfate and a flavonol, whereas its two products are adenosine 3',5'-bisphosphate and flavonol 3-sulfate. A specific examples of a flavonol that can act as a substrate is quercetin.

This enzyme belongs to the family of transferases termed the sulfotransferases, which transfer sulfate groups.  The systematic name of this enzyme class is 3'-phosphoadenylyl-sulfate:flavonol 3-sulfotransferase.

References 

EC 2.8.2
Enzymes of unknown structure